Set It Up is a 2018 American romantic comedy film directed by Claire Scanlon, written by Katie Silberman, and starring Zoey Deutch, Glen Powell, Taye Diggs, and Lucy Liu. The plot follows two overworked assistants who try to set up their demanding bosses on dates in New York City. The film was released on June 15, 2018, by Netflix, to favorable reviews.

Plot
Harper Moore is the assistant to Kirsten Stevens, a former journalist and now editor of an online sports journalism empire. Charlie Young is the assistant to high-strung venture capitalist Rick Otis. They work in the same building and meet one night when their bosses need dinner. 

Harper has ordered dinner for Kirsten but has no cash to pay for it; Charlie, who was not able to order dinner for Rick, pays for it to give to Rick. When Harper tells him she will be fired if she does not return with food, Charlie allows her to take one of the meals.

The next day Harper reimburses Charlie for the food, and they talk about their jobs. Though Rick is abrasive, his connections would guarantee Charlie a promotion. Harper admires Kirsten's career and aspires to write sports journalism. Both assistants complain that they have no time for their personal lives. 

Harper jokes that both of their bosses need to get laid, then reasons that if their bosses were dating each other, they would have less time to overwork their assistants. After his girlfriend Suze almost breaks up with him due to his lack of free time, Charlie agrees.

Their initial plot to have Rick and Kirsten "meet cute" in a stalled elevator goes awry when they are joined by a delivery man suffering from claustrophobia who starts stripping and urinating. Charlie and Harper then arrange for the two to sit beside each other at a baseball game, bribing the operator of the kiss-cam to pressure them into kissing. After three attempts, Rick and Kirsten kiss. They begin dating, leaving Charlie time to spend with Suze, and Harper time to date.

However, things between Rick and Kirsten quickly become bumpy and Harper and Charlie realize they must work hard to keep their bosses together. They manipulate the two into staying together by secretly planning dates, leaving notes and gifts, and organizing a weekend getaway for them. When Charlie is ignored by Suze, he accompanies Harper to her best friend Becca's engagement party.

Returning from their vacation, Rick and Kirsten reveal they are now engaged. Harper and Charlie are thrilled, but Charlie learns that Rick proposed to Kirsten to aggravate his ex-wife Kiki, who he is still sleeping with. Harper discovers this when she overhears Rick having phone sex with Kiki. She confronts Charlie and is disappointed to learn that he knew about it and still wants Kirsten and Rick to get married.

Harper goes to Kirsten and explains that she and Charlie manipulated them into dating; Kirsten fires her and plans to go on with the wedding. Charlie, realizing he doesn't love Suze, breaks up with her and runs to the airport, where Rick and Kirsten are about to leave to elope. Charlie quits his job and tells Kirsten that Rick doesn't love her and doesn't know her at all. Kirsten realizes it is true and leaves Rick.

Harper goes through a crisis with her writing, but Becca encourages her to make progress. Rick asks for Charlie's help in reuniting with his ex-wife. Harper goes to her office to pick up her things. Kirsten tries to hire her back but Harper refuses, choosing to focus on her writing. Kirsten offers to edit her article.

As she is leaving, Harper sees Charlie, who has been called there by Kirsten. They realize that Kirsten is attempting to set them up. Charlie reveals that he now works as a temp, hoping to learn what he actually wants to do. Harper and Charlie kiss upon confessing that they like each other, despite having many reasons not to.

In a mid-credits scene, Creepy Tim watches the couple through security cameras.

Cast
 Zoey Deutch as Harper Moore, Kirsten's assistant
 Glen Powell as Charlie Young, Rick's assistant
 Lucy Liu as Kirsten Stevens, Harper's boss
 Taye Diggs as Rick Otis, Charlie's boss
 Joan Smalls as Suze, Charlie's girlfriend
 Meredith Hagner as Becca, Harper's engaged roommate
 Pete Davidson as Duncan, Charlie's roommate
 Jon Rudnitsky as Mike, Becca's fiancé
 Tituss Burgess as Creepy Tim, janitor
 Noah Robbins as Intern Bo
 Jaboukie Young-White as Assistant Alex

Production
In February 2016, it was announced Emilia Clarke had been cast in the film, with Katie Silberman writing the film, while Justin Nappi and Juliet Berman producing the film under their TreeHouse Pictures banner, while Metro-Goldwyn-Mayer was originally set to distribute the film. In March 2017, it was announced Zoey Deutch and Glen Powell had joined the cast of the film, with Deutch replacing Clarke, Claire Scanlon directing from a screenplay written by Katie Silberman. Netflix eventually replaced Metro-Goldwyn-Mayer as the film's distributor. In June 2017, Taye Diggs, Lucy Liu, and Joan Smalls joined the cast of the film. Principal photography began in June 2017 in New York City.

Release
The film was released on Netflix on June 15, 2018.

Reception
On review aggregator website Rotten Tomatoes, the film an approval rating of 92% based on 60 reviews, and an average rating of 7/10. The site's critical consensus reads, "Set It Up follows the long-established outlines of the rom-com template – and in the process, proves there's still substantial pleasure to be wrought from familiar formulas." On Metacritic, the film has a weighted average score of 62 out of 100, based on 14 critics, indicating "generally favorable reviews".

Possible sequel
Scanlon has said in interviews that she has ideas for a possible sequel should Netflix schedule one. On March 8, 2023 Netflix released a never-before-seen compilation video of outtakes from the film.

References

External links
 

2018 directorial debut films
2018 romantic comedy films
2010s English-language films
American romantic comedy films
English-language Netflix original films
Films about interracial romance
Films directed by Claire Scanlon
Films set in New York City
Films shot in New York City
2010s American films
Films with screenplays by Katie Silberman